HPM.1 is Hardware Platform Management IPM Controller Firmware Upgrade Specification of PICMG. This specification describes firmware upgrade procedure into PICMG IPM Controllers (Not PICMG 3.0 Shelf Management Controller (ShMC)), as specified in the
specifications AdvancedTCA, 
AdvancedMC and MicroTCA specifications. An Upgrade Agent (Ex:ipmitool) upgrades firmware via any IPMI interfaces (IPMB-0 or IPMB-L, LAN, UART or any Shelf-Carrier Manager). The specification also describes format of upgrade image. The upgrade image can contain one or more than one component's firmware. The upgrade agent upgrades the component's firmware one by one. The IPM controller can have more than one component (U-Boot, Linux, rfs, FPGA, etc.). The firmware upgrade procedure contains three stages (Preparation Stage, Upgrade Stage, and Activation Stage). In preparation stage Upgrade Agent gets target capabilities and all component properties. Then it compares this information with Upgrade image. If there is a mismatch, Upgrade Agent abandons the firmware upgrade. Otherwise it moves into Upgrade stage. In Upgrade stage upgrade agent sends all components firmware one by one. After successfully receiving the firmware, IPM controller waits for activation. In Activation stage Upgrade Agent activates newly uploaded firmware. If self-test is supported by IPM controller, then it is invoked. If self-test fails, IPM controller automatically rolls back to previous firmware. If IPM controller does not support automatic roll back, operator or Upgrade Agent has to initiate the manual roll back.

References

 PICMG. "Reference". PICMG 3.0 HPM.1 R1.0 Specification. http://www.picmg.org

External links 
Official AdvancedTCA Site
Official PICMG Site
What is ATCA?
Interoperable Firmware Upgrades for PICMG Management Controllers

Computer networking
Computer buses
Telecommunications equipment